Riget (English title: The Kingdom) is a Danish absurdist supernatural horror miniseries trilogy created by Lars von Trier and Tómas Gislason. Set in the neurosurgical ward of Copenhagen's Rigshospitalet (nicknamed "Riget"), each episode of the show takes place over a single day, and follows the hospital's eccentric staff and patients as they encounter bizarre and sometimes supernatural phenomena. The series is notable for its wry humor, its muted sepia colour scheme, and the appearance of a chorus of dishwashers with Down syndrome, who discuss in intimate detail the strange occurrences in the hospital. The main theme's song was written by von Trier himself.

The first series of four episodes premiered from DR in November to December 1994, and was followed by a second series, Riget II, which aired in November 1997. A belated third and final series of five episodes directed by von Trier and written by von Trier with Niels Vørsel, entitled Exodus, began filming in 2021, was screened out of competition at the Venice Film Festival and at the Serial Killer festival in September 2022, and premiered in the Nordics on streaming platform Viaplay with the first two episodes on October 9. The series premiered in select regions between November 27 and December 25 on streaming platform MUBI.

Von Trier has credited David Lynch's 1990 television series Twin Peaks and the 1965 French miniseries Belphegor as inspirations for the series. The Kingdom itself inspired an American series, Kingdom Hospital, developed by novelist Stephen King; the American version aired on ABC between March and July 2004, and was cancelled after a single season.

Plot synopsis 

Each episode of all three series opens with the same prologue, detailing how the hospital, Rigshospitalet in Copenhagen, was built on the site of the "bleaching ponds", which recur in the name of the street of the hospital's official address, Blegdamsvej, although the exact significance of the reference is never explicitly discussed in the series.

The show begins with the admission of a spiritualist patient, Sigrid Drusse (Kirsten Rolffes), who hears the sound of a girl crying in the elevator shaft. Upon investigation, Drusse discovers that the girl had died decades earlier, having been killed by her father to hide her illegitimacy. In order to put the spirit to rest, Drusse searches for the girl's body and ultimately finds it preserved in a specimen jar in the office of the hospital's professor of pathology, Professor Bondo (Baard Owe).

Meanwhile, neurosurgeon Stig Helmer (Ernst-Hugo Järegård), a recent appointee from Sweden to the neurosurgery department, tries to cover up his responsibility for a botched operation which left a young girl in a persistent vegetative state.

Pathologist Dr. Palle Bondo (Baard Owe) attempts to convince the family of a man dying from liver cancer to donate his liver to the hospital for Bondo's research. (In fact, Bondo wants it as a trophy, as it is the second largest hepatosarcoma ever recorded.) When denied, Bondo has the cancerous liver transplanted into his own body (as the patient signed an organ donor form), so that the cancer will become his personal property and can be kept within the hospital.

Amongst other plotlines, a young medical student becomes attracted to the nurse in charge of the sleep research laboratory, a ghostly ambulance appears and disappears every night, a junior doctor runs a black market in medical supplies, and a neurosurgeon discovers that she was impregnated by a ghost and that the baby in her womb is developing abnormally rapidly. In every episode, two dishwashers (each with Down syndrome) in the cellar discuss the strange happenings at Riget, and Helmer screams his famous catchphrase: "Danskjävlar!" (subtitled as "Danish scum", but literally "Danish devils").

In the third series, Exodus, sleepwalker Karen Svensson finds herself at Rigshospitalet, investigating the fallout of the fatal power outage at the end of the second series. Exodus also introduces Dr. Helmer, Jr. (Mikael Persbrandt), the neurotic son of the late Stig Helmer, and a new addition to the staff of Riget. Helmer Jr. is threatened with a lawsuit after making unwanted sexual advances to a female colleague in the hospital, has to consult an expensive son of Swedish lawyer (Alexander Skarsgard) and faces professional disgrace unless he pays compensation to the woman whose false nipples he had so admired.

Cast

Production

Riget: Exodus (2022) 
In December 2020, Danmarks Radio announced that a third and final season, consisting of five episodes directed by von Trier and co-written by von Trier alongside original series co-writer Niels Vørsel, would begin filming in 2021 under the title Riget: Exodus. The same year, von Trier began showing symptoms of Parkinson's disease during an interview with Christian Lund of Louisiana Channel; afterwards, he continued to work while taking medication. Von Trier did not watch "all the old ones" before beginning work on Riget: Exodus, and had tried "to get rid of the ties from the old stuff", with the focus being on the characters.

Returning cast members Ghita Nørby, Søren Pilmark, Peter Mygind, Birgitte Raaberg, Laura Christensen and Udo Kier are joined by newcomers Bodil Jørgensen, Nicolas Bro, Lars Mikkelsen, Nikolaj Lie Kaas, Mikael Persbrandt, Tuva Novotny, Ida Engvoll, Asta August, David Dencik and Alexander Skarsgard. Von Trier had a "rotten time" filming the series, as he suffered from the effects of Parkinson's disease during the shoot, but hoped the actors "didn't notice".

In September 2022, Exodus (presented as a "five hour feature-length film") screened out of competition at the 79th Venice International Film Festival, alongside Nicolas Winding Refn's miniseries Copenhagen Cowboy.

Episodes

Riget (1994)

Riget II (1997)

Riget: Exodus (2022)

Release 

The four-episode first series of Riget was aired by Danish broadcaster Danmarks Radio (DR) from 24 November to 15 December 1994.

The four-episode second series, Riget II, aired on DR between 10 and 31 October 1997.

The five-episode third series, Riget: Exodus, premiered on streaming platform MUBI on 27 November 2022, with its fifth and final episode premiering on Christmas Day.

Home media 
The series was edited into a five-hour, two-part film, which received some theatrical exhibition, and was released on home video in America and the United Kingdom. It is available on DVD in Australia and New Zealand on Madman Entertainment's Directors Suite label, in the UK from Second Sight, and in the United States from Koch-Lorber Films.

Streaming 
Newly restored HD editions of the first two series premiered on MUBI on 13 November and 20 November 2022, respectively; the debut of the restored series is a precursor to the premiere of Exodus on the platform on 27 November.

Reception

Critical reception 
On Metacritic, all three seasons has a weighted average score of 77 out of 100 from 9 reviews, indicating "generally positive reviews".

I and II 
Film critic Leonard Maltin, who reviewed the two-part theatrical version, awarded it three and a half out of a possible four stars, calling it "a must-see for those who think they've seen everything".

Despite being a miniseries, The Kingdom appears in the best-selling book 1001 Movies You Must See Before You Die, where it is called "a medical horror epic", with its supernatural elements described as being both eerie and magical.

Exodus 

On review aggregation website Rotten Tomatoes, the third season has an approval rating of 86% with a "Certified Fresh" based on 21 reviews, with an average rating of 6.80/10. The site's critical consensus reads, "An acquired taste for newcomers and comfort weirdness for Lars von Trier's devotees, The Kingdom: Exodus is a cheeky delicacy infused with cosmic horror that reaches biblically insane proportions."

Exodus was warmly received by critics following its premiere at the Venice in September 2022, with Variety calling it "over-the-top" and "fun", and the Italian Post praised the series, saying it "amuses and disturbs", and comparing it positively to Twin Peaks. The Upcoming gave the series 3/5, praising its "dark humour" and noting that it feels like a "tribute to Lars von Trier's career, a revisiting of his early work... filled with the wobbly handheld shots that distinguished the Dogme 95 movement". Giving it 3/5 stars, The Guardian called the series "a nightmarish revue, peppered with familiar faces in brief walk-on roles", and said that it is "fun to a point and richly textured to a fault, with a plot that’s entirely driven by what has gone before".

Accolades

American adaptation 

Horror novelist Stephen King discovered the five-hour theatrical edit of Riget in a video store during production of the 1997 TV miniseries adaptation of The Shining, and, finding it "both funny and scary", promptly set out to obtain the rights to the series for an American adaptation. At that time, the rights were owned by Columbia Pictures, who had intended to adapt the series as a two-hour theatrical film. King negotiated with Columbia for the rights, ultimately exchanging them for the option to his novella "Secret Window, Secret Garden" (which Columbia adapted in 2004 as the feature film Secret Window).

King's thirteen episode television adaptation, titled Kingdom Hospital, broadcast between March and July 2004 on ABC. Often directly adapting storylines from the original series, Kingdom Hospital was set in a hospital in Lewiston, Maine, which was on the site of a mill built before the Civil War. Many character names were derived from their Danish equivalents, e.g., Sigrid Drusse became Sally Druse and Stig Helmer became Dr. Stegman. In a departure from the plot of Riget, the American series introduces a new protagonist, a comatose patient, Peter Rickman, inspired by King's own experience of being hit by a minivan, and a talking giant anteater, the spirit guide Anubis/Antubis.

Although King and co-writer Richard Dooling developed an outline for a second series, ratings dropped throughout the season. Kingdom Hospital was placed on indefinite hiatus following a "major network shake-up", and was never picked up for a second series.

See also 

 List of ghost films

References

External links 
 
 
 

1990s Danish television series
1994 Danish television series debuts
1994 films
1994 horror films
1997 Danish television series endings
Danish drama television series
Danish-language television shows
Down syndrome in television
DR television dramas
Healthcare in Denmark
Horror fiction television series
Lars von Trier
Zentropa films
Trilogies
Psychological drama television and other works